The Brooks Woodland Preserve is a  open space preserve located in Petersham, Massachusetts. The property, named after industrialist and diplomat James Wilson Brooks, is managed by the land conservation non-profit organization The Trustees of Reservations and offers  of trails and primitive woods roads available for hiking, horseback riding, and cross country skiing. Second growth forest, overgrown farm fields, granite ledges, historic stone walls, creeks, and rolling hills characterize the preserve.

The property is divided into three contiguous parcels, the Roaring Brook Tract, Swift River Tract, and Connor's Pond Tract. Trailheads are located off Massachusetts Route 32, East Street, Oliver Street and Quaker Drive in Petersham. A network of trails runs between the tracts and abutting conservation land. Moccasin Brook and the East Branch of the Swift River pass through the center of the preserve.

History and conservation
The Preserve is named for Aaron Brooks, Jr's son, James Wilson Brooks, lawyer, diplomat, and co-founder of the United Shoe Machinery Company. Acquired in 1975, the property was formerly farmland, now overgrown with forest following the migration of agricultural interests to the midwest in the late 19th century. Cellar holes and old stone walls indicative of this former use dot the property.

References

External links
Map of Brooks Woodland Preserve
The Trustees of Reservations 
Harvard Forest
Rutland Brook Sanctuary

The Trustees of Reservations
Protected areas of Worcester County, Massachusetts
Open space reserves of Massachusetts
Protected areas established in 1975
1975 establishments in Massachusetts